Don't Burn the Witch... is a split EP by thrash metal bands Toxic Holocaust, Minotaur, Evil Angel and Goat Messiah released under Midnight Records.

Track listing

Personnel
Toxic Holocaust
 Joel Grind  — vocals and guitar
 Phil Zeller — bass and vocals
 Nick Bellmore — drums

References

2006 EPs
Toxic Holocaust albums